Lonely Hearts is a 1982 Australian film directed by Paul Cox which won the 1982 AFI Award for Best Film and was nominated in four other categories.

Plot
Shortly after the death of his mother, middle-aged, Peter, realizes how lonely he is.  Hoping to find adventure, he signs on with a dating agency in search of a companion. Soon, Peter is introduced to a shy bank clerk Patricia.  Patricia is younger than Peter, but is also lonely, having endured smothering parents.

Cast
Wendy Hughes as Patricia Curnow
Norman Kaye as Peter Thompson
Jon Finlayson as George
Julia Blake as Pamela
Jonathan Hardy as Bruce
Irene Inescort as Patricia's mother
Vic Gordon as Patricia's father
Ted Grove-Rogers as Peter's father

Production
Paul Cox wrote the first two drafts, then Phillip Adams proposed the movie be the first of four films made by the Adams-Packer company. John Clarke was brought in to co-write and John Murray became producer. Cox was paid $30,000 which he says was the first payment he ever received for making a film.

The film was shot over six weeks with two weeks for rehearsal.

Release
The film was extremely well received and screened widely overseas, establishing Cox's reputation.

Bob Ellis later argued that the movie was Cox's best because more time and care was put into it with less improvisation. "It had a producer, a director, a script editor, you know, the usual apparatus and, of course, it's a full and wonderful film. His other ones are like brief, infinitely prolonged screams or sonatas or something..."

Home media
Lonely Hearts was released on DVD by Umbrella Entertainment in August 2007. The DVD is compatible with all region codes and includes special features such as the theatrical trailer and interviews with Paul Cox, John Clarke and Wendy Hughes.

See also
Cinema of Australia

References

External links

Lonely Hearts at the Australian screen
Lonely Hearts at Oz Movies
 
 
NFSA info

1982 films
Australian drama films
Films directed by Paul Cox
Films shot in Melbourne
1982 drama films
1980s English-language films
1980s Australian films